House of Tolerance (also known as House of Pleasures) is 2011 French drama film written and directed by Bertrand Bonello, starring Hafsia Herzi, Céline Sallette, Jasmine Trinca, Adèle Haenel, Alice Barnole, Iliana Zabeth and Noémie Lvovsky. The film had its world premiere in the Competition section of the Cannes Film Festival on 16 May 2011.

Plot
The story is set in a luxurious Parisian brothel (a maison close, like Le Chabanais) in the early 20th century and follows the closeted life of a group of prostitutes: their rivalries, hopes, fears, pleasures and pains.

Cast

Production
The genesis of the project was a merge of two film ideas Bertrand Bonello had been thinking of. About ten years earlier he had tried to make a film about modern brothels, but the project had been cancelled. After finishing On War (2008), Bonello decided that he wanted his next film to be about dynamics within a group of women, and his partner suggested a film about prostitutes in a historical setting. The director then became interested in the aspect of a brothel as a closed world from the viewpoint of the prostitutes. The idea of a scar in the form of a smile came from the film The Man Who Laughs (1928), an adaptation of Victor Hugo's novel with the same name. Bonello says he dreamed about the film two nights in a row while he was writing House of Tolerance, and decided to include a female character with such a scar.

The film was a co-production between Les Films du Lendemain and the director's company My New Picture, in collaboration with Arte France Cinéma. The production received 540,000 euro from the Centre national du cinéma et de l'image animée (CNC) and 416,000 euro from the Île-de-France region, as well as pre-sales investment from Canal+ and CinéCinéma. The total budget was 3.8 million euro. Casting took almost nine months. Bonello wanted a mixed ensemble of both professionals and amateurs who above all worked well together as a group.

Filming started in Saint-Rémy-lès-Chevreuse on 31 May 2010 and lasted eight weeks. The film was recorded on one continuous set, which allowed the camera to move between each room without cuts. Bonello chose to focus the camera on the girls and almost never their clients. He explained: "it reinforces the impression that the prostitute is above the client. I told the actresses: 'Be careful, I want twelve intelligent girls.' It was really important for me: they're not being fooled, they are strong women."

Release

The film had its world premiere at the 2011 Cannes Film Festival in the Competition section on 16 May 2011. It was the fourth time a film by Bonello was screened at the festival, and the second time in the main competition, following Tiresia (2003). It was released in France by Haut et Court on 21 September 2011.

Reception

Critical reception
On review aggregator website Rotten Tomatoes, the film has an approval rating of 83% based on 29 reviews, and an average rating of 7.2/10. On Metacritic, which assigns a normalized rating, the film has a score 75 out of 100, based on 9 critics, indicating "generally favorable reviews".

Phil Coldiron of Slant Magazine gave the film 4 out of 4 stars, writing, "Not many films have ever approached the possibilities afforded by the slippery subjectivity of cinematic time so directly, or with such intelligence." Roger Ebert gave the film 3.5 out of 4 stars, describing it as "a morose elegy to the decline of a luxurious Parisian bordello, circa 1900, a closed world in which prostitutes and their clients glide like sleepwalkers through the motions of sex."

Accolades

References

External links

 
 

2011 films
2011 drama films
2010s French-language films
2010s historical drama films
Arte France Cinéma films
Films about prostitution in Paris
Films directed by Bertrand Bonello
Films set in 1899
Films set in 1900
Films shot in France
French historical drama films
Films with screenplays by Bertrand Bonello
2010s French films